Mahongole is an administrative ward in the Mbarali district of the Mbeya Region of Tanzania. In 2016 the Tanzania National Bureau of Statistics report there were 12,943 people in the ward, from 11,744 in 2012.

Villages and hamlets 
The ward has 6 villages, and 33 hamlets.

 Ilaji
 Ilaji
 Isengo
 Mlowo
 Msikitini 'A'
 Msikitini 'B'
 Ilongo
 Ihango
 Ijumbi
 Ilongo
 Mpakani
 Mwafwaka
 Kapyo
 Kapyo 'A'
 Kapyo 'B'
 Kapyo 'C'
 Kapyo 'D'
 Kapyo 'E'
 Mpakani 'A'
 Mpakani 'B'
 Mahongole
 CCM 'A'
 Kagera
 Kilabuni
 Mashala
 Msikitini
 Nsonyanga
 Mbago
 Mkoji
 Nsonyanga 'A'
 Nsonyanga 'B'
 Rwanda 'A'
 Rwanda 'B'
 Igalako
 CCM 'B'
 Majengo
 Mbange
 Sokoni
 Uchagani

References 

Wards of Mbeya Region